Andrew Marston (born 24 October 1981) is an English radio presenter, music producer and club DJ.  He works with musicians under the BBC Music Introducing scheme. He was the first person to give airtime to artists such as Ellie Goulding, Becky Hill and 220 Kid.

Early career 
Marston represented his school as a musician playing keyboards in various bands and with their orchestra. It was through a couple of gigs he did for the church and the city's MP where he was offered his first paid job playing the church organ at St Barnabas and at All Saints in Hereford. This he did for two years while regularly touring the country in a covers band.

Hospital radio 
At the age of 14, Marston become a volunteer with Hereford Hospital radio, providing PA services at local events and presenting a magazine show called "MusiChat". He later became the station's vice-chairman and publicity manager.

By 1999, he put together HHR Live '99, where all of the city's main bands performed on stage in Hereford's High Town, in front of thousands of people, attracting front-page coverage from the local press. In 2000, he won a bronze award for BT Non-Music Programme of the Year for his local news show.

DJing 
 At the age of 14, Marston became the resident DJs at the Jailhouse Nightclub in Hereford during their weekly kids' nights and soon after started providing mobile discos.

Over the next few years he went on to hold down a number of long-term residencies at no fewer than ten venues, while continuing to guest at clubs across the region.

BBC 
Marston began working for BBC Hereford & Worcester in 1999, following a work experience placement. Initially his job was putting guests on-air, whether this would be for his home station or for the likes of BBC Radio 4, BBC Radio 5 Live, Newsbeat and the BBC World Service. During a visit to the Worcester studios, Marston was asked if he'd like to be trained as a broadcast assistant – and three weeks later, without the training, Marston was looking after the general day-to-day running of the Hereford office.

Later work included live and pre-recorded interviews, the reading of market reports, the writing of bulletin pieces and ultimately two years as the main Hereford radiocar reporter at breakfast. It was during this time Marston covered major fires, floods and later the outbreak of foot-and-mouth disease. Marston also reported on the Queen's visit to Royal Worcester and would, every year, present live from the Remembrance Service.

In 2001, Marston started working at BBC Radio Gloucestershire on the Vernon Harwood breakfast show. He re-recorded the station's jingle package and become an active reporter, as well as presenting travel news in the evenings. His reporting work included live coverage of Camilla, Duchess of Cornwall's opening of the Magg's Day Centre in Cheltenham.

New music 
In 2003, Marston began working as a promoter and started a weekly band night in Hereford. For more than two years, Marston hosted, giving a paid opportunity to many local bands including Brandon Steep> and The Myth (who were finalists in the BBC Midlands Today School of Rock competition).

In June 2005, Marston was approached by BBC Online's Dan Johnson about helping out on a new music programme for BBC Hereford & Worcester. The BBC had been publishing album reviews online, but Dan had said to bosses "why don't we stop talking about music – and actually play it?". A week before transmission Marston took the role of representing Herefordshire in a demo..

Within weeks, senior management within radio began to question whether this was the right move for local audiences and a task force was employed to review the programme. More than 20 bands were invited to the Hylton Road studios by BBC representatives to stage a round-table debate. It was during this meeting the BBC Introducing scheme was born, enabling local stations to "vet" local tracks and submit them to the national stations.

In 2007, Dan Johnson left the then-called Friday Session to pursue a career as the Head of Sport Online, leaving Marston in charge.

During his time at the BBC, Marston has also appeared several times as a guest speaker at Worcester College of Technology.

Website production 
In 2006, Marston began working for BBC Online, producing news articles, image galleries and local features. He helped reshape the systems that enabled local teams to publish photo galleries and his photos of The Big Chill (music festival) and the Worcester Warriors regularly attracted more than 15,000 unique users per day – but his biggest achievements were during the 2007 summer floods where many of his images attracted a record audience of 6 million hits in a week.

Marston was also commissioned to create the "Music Map" feature for BBC Online as well as "The People's History Of Pop". Throughout these projects, he met bands like Mott the Hoople, The Pretenders and Dodgy – unearthing many of the demo tapes that got them signed, while producing previously unwritten articles on The Beatles, Queen, Aerosmith, The Who, Pink Floyd, U2, The Rolling Stones, Fleetwood Mac, The Kinks, Led Zeppelin, Tom Jones, T. Rex, Jimi Hendrix, Clifford T. Ward, David Bowie, Black Sabbath, Roy Orbison, Captain Beefheart, Rick Wakeman, The Eagles, The Spencer Davis Group (featuring Steve Winwood), Manfred Mann, Small Faces, The Yardbirds, Donovan, The Merseybeats, The Moody Blues, The Searchers, Engelbert Humperdinck, UB40, Roy Harper, Underworld, Toyah Willcox, John Peel, Jimmy Cliff, Herman's Hermits, The Animals, Cilla Black, Freddie and the Dreamers, The Tremeloes, The Troggs and Jethro Tull.

Awards 
Having secured awards with hospital radio for Non-Music Programme of the Year, Marston landed a role at the BBC which would lead him to redesign all of the trails for the station, remake the entire jingle package and cut a number of prize-winning entries, including BBC Hereford & Worcester's Station of the Year 2010 at the Sony Radio Academy Awards and various prizes in the Frank Gillard Awards (including diversity, made up of segments from his own show). It was some of his contributions from the Wychwood Festival that went into the submission that won BBC Introducing their gold at the Sony Radio Academy Awards in 2011. Marston was also on-air during the 2007 summer floods and found himself presenting a news programme from 7pm until midnight instead of his new music programme.

BBC Music Introducing 
Marston was responsible for taking Sam Isaac to Glastonbury Festival and the BBC Electric Proms, Pencil Toes, The Anomalies and Pegasus Bridge to BBC Maida Vale Studios, while securing the brother/sister duo Muchuu a support slot with Florence & The Machine and The Temper Trap alongside a spot on the BBC Radio 1 playlist. He also landed The Roving Crows a place on tour with Jamie Cullum, George Barnett, two spots on the BBC Radio 1 playlist, as well as a place on stage at the Wychwood Festival and BBC Radio 2’s Live In Hyde Park: Festival In A Day.

After conducting all of the artist interviews at Bestival for BBC Radio 1, Marston began hosting his own stages at local festivals – enabling bands to play live on-air in front of thousands at events including Hay Festival, Lakefest, The Big Chill (music festival), Wyeside, Nozstock: The Hidden Valley, The Worcester Music Festival, SnodFest in Upton Snodsbury, and taking over stage curation duties from BBC 6 Music's Tom Robinson at the Wychwood Festival. He also selects acts for Glastonbury Festival, Reading and Leeds Festivals, Radio 1's Big Weekend and T in the Park.

He was the first person to give airtime to artists such as Ellie Goulding, Becky Hill 220 Kid Peace, Andy Robinson, AurA, and This Wicked Tongue

Present day 
Marston has performed in front of thousands at a variety of festivals, including opening slots at Nozstock: The Hidden Valley, Lakefest, Upton Sunshine Festival, Mello Festival, Lakefest, The Big Chill (music festival) and closing off the Wychwood Festival on Cheltenham Racecourse.

During his time at the BBC, Marston worked with or interviewed Dave Pearce (DJ), Pam Ayres (Poet), Kate Adie (Journalist), Sonique (Musician), Jo Whiley (Presenter), David Dimbleby (Television Presenter), Leo Baxendale (Creator of The Beano), Basement Jaxx (Producers), John OO Fleming (DJ), Craig Charles (Actor/DJ), Steve Hackett (Genesis band), Kutski (DJ), Lisa Lashes (DJ), Anne Savage (DJ), H "Two" O (Producers), White Lies (band), Seb Fontaine (DJ), Tall Paul (DJ), DJ Fresh, Sy (DJ), Graham Turner of Flip & Fill, Bus Stop (band), Eyeopener and A&R at All Around the World Productions, The Utah Saints (Producers)], Tim Wheeler of Ash (band), Professor Green (Rapper), Iglu & Hartly (Band), Gilles Peterson (Presenter), Zane Lowe (Presenter), Martin Chambers (Musician), Verden Allen (Musician), José González (Musician), Don Letts (Film Producer), Fyfe Dangerfield of The Guillemots (Band), The Blockheads (Band), The Proclaimers (Band), Norman Jay MBE (DJ), Huw Stephens (Presenter), Kissy Sell Out (DJ), William Hague (MP), Patrick Stewart (Actor) and Eve Myles (Torchwood Actress), to name but a few.

In 2012, Marston took up video DJing and started providing live visuals to the tracks he performs. As an active musician, he regularly tours with a rapper and percussionist, while playing live keys to create new mashups of songs.

He has also commercially released a number of dance tracks with musicians he has met during his career, including Nigel Clark of Dodgy – many of which he plays out live.

References 

1981 births
Living people
People from Hereford
English radio presenters
English DJs
English radio DJs
Club DJs
Electronic dance music DJs